The C.E. Conrad Memorial Cemetery in Kalispell, Montana was listed on the National Register of Historic Places in 2012.

The National Register listing included two contributing buildings, two contributing structures, two contributing sites, and two contributing objects.

It was designed as a classic rural cemetery of style occurring on the East coast, and was designed by architect Arthur W. Hobert. It includes Greek Revival architecture and dates from 1903. It was named for Charles E. Conrad, businessman and owner of the Charles E. Conrad Mansion, which is also NRHP-listed.

Created by Alicia B. Conrad, wife of C.E. Conrad, it is operated by a private nonprofit.  Notable burials include former Montana Governors John E. Erickson and Robert Burns Smith. Western painter Leonard Lopp is buried here.

References

-External links
 
 

Rural cemeteries
Cemeteries on the National Register of Historic Places in Montana
National Register of Historic Places in Flathead County, Montana
Greek Revival architecture in Montana
Buildings and structures completed in 1903
Kalispell, Montana
1903 establishments in Montana